Suessiales is an order of dinoflagellates.

It includes Borghiella, Glenodinium, Polarella and Symbiodinium.

References

1. Murray S, Flø Jørgensen M, Ho SY, Patterson DJ, Jermiin LS (November 2005). "Improving the analysis of dinoflagellate phylogeny based on rDNA". Protist. 156 (3): 269–86. . PMID 16325541.

2. Knechtel J, J Kretschmann, J Chacón & M Gottschling (2020): Dinastridium verrucosum Baumeister from Bavaria (Germany) is a borghiellacean dinophyte (†Suessiales). Protist 171: 125741. 

3. Moestrup, Ø., Lindberg, K., & Daugbjerg, N. (2009). Studies on woloszynskioid dinoflagellates IV: The genus Biecheleria gen. nov. Phycological Research, 57(3), 203–220.

External links 
 

Taxa described in 1993
Dinoflagellate orders
Dinophyceae